Proneuronema is an extinct genus of lacewing in the neuropteran family Hemerobiidae known from fossils found in North America and Baltic amber.  The genus currently contains three species, the amber species P. gradatum and P. minor plus the Ypresian P. wehri of Washington state.

References

Hemerobiiformia
Prehistoric insect genera